Sheikh Muhammad Sadiq or S M Sadiq is a Pakistani lyricist and a poet whose written songs frequently have been sung by Ustad Nusrat Fateh Ali Khan, and other singers like Attaullah Khan Esakhelvi, Aziz Mian, Shabnam Majeed and Arif Lohar.

He has written thousands of songs in the Punjabi, Urdu and Hindi languages. He is known not only in Pakistan but also in India.

Early life and career
Sheikh Muhammad Sadiq (S. M. Sadiq) was born in Faisalabad, Punjab, Pakistan. He completed only up to 4th grade education in the primary school. In an interview with Dr. Farah in PTV morning show he described his first meeting with Nusrat Fateh Ali Khan. He narrates that he was only 14 years old when he went to Jhang main bazar with a piece of poetry (narrating a story 'dastan'). When he reached the place Ustad used to practice his music, his secretary introduced him to Nusrat Fateh Ali Khan. Ustad meet him, read his poetry and said you have a rare talent but I do not sing stories, write me something in Punjabi preferably a spiritual qawwali. Sadiq narrates that he wrote Othe amla de hone ne nabede  and Ainwen Bol Na Banere Utte Kanwan , two of the most famous qawales of Nusrat Fateh Ali Khan

Credited for these hit songs
 Othay Amlaan Dey Hone Ne Navede, Kissay Nahin Teri Zaat Puchhni, A qawwali song by Nusrat Fateh Ali Khan
 Achha Sila Diya Tuu Ney Mere Pyar Ka, Soundtrack by Sonu Nigam in film Bewafa Sanam (1995)
 Mel Karade Rabba, Sung by Jasbir Jassi for the Punjabi movie Mel Karade Rabba (2010)

Publications
  OCLC number: 473670024

Films
 S M Sadiq wrote the film song lyrics of the Indian Hindi language film, Shaheed-E-Azam (2002). This film was based on the real-life story of Indian political martyr, Shaheed Bhagat Singh.
 Mel Karade Rabba (2010)
 Bewafa Sanam (1995)

References

7. https://www.youtube.com/watch?v=KMES2RwFIsU&t=95s&ab_channel=AmanDeep

External links

 S M Sadiq songs on Yahoo Music
 S M Sadiq written song, sung by Daler Mehndi

Year of birth missing (living people)
Living people
Pakistani lyricists
Pakistani poets
Poets from Punjab, Pakistan
Punjabi-language poets
Urdu-language poets from Pakistan
People from Faisalabad